The 3rd and 4th Divisions was a naval formation of the Home Fleet, Royal Navy. It was created before the First World War from March 1909 until May 1912.

In March 1909, following a Royal Navy re-organisation, the Channel Fleet was absorbed by the Home Fleet.  The ships in home waters, including the former Channel Fleet, then became the Home Fleet's First and Second Divisions. The former Home Fleet as it then stood became the Third and Fourth Divisions, which was actually a single formation under a vice-admiral. These new divisions was made up of an 8-12 ship battle squadron that included either dreadnought battleships or pre-dreadnought battleships. Within the Home Fleet there were two levels of availability - the ships of the 1st and 2nd Divisions which were fully operational, and those of the 3rd and 4th divisions that were either in reserve or partially manned.

Vice-Admirals Commanding 3rd and 4th Divisions
Post holders included:

Rear Admirals in the 3rd and 4th Divisions
Post holders included:

Devonport Division 
Post holders included:

Components 
Included:

Nore Division 
The Rear-Admiral Commanding, Nore Division, Home Fleet from 4 January, 1909 - 5 January, 1910 was Rear Admiral Charles J. Briggs.

Components 
Included:

Portsmouth Division 
Post holders included:

Components 
Included:

References

Sources
 Friedman, Norman (2014). Fighting the Great War at Sea: Strategy, Tactic and Technology. Seaforth Publishing. .
 Mackie, Gordon. "Royal Navy Senior Appointments from 1865" (PDF). gulabin.com. Gordon Mackie, p. 199. December 2017.
 Watson, Dr Graham. (2015) "Royal Navy Organisation and Ship Deployments 1900-1914". www.naval-history.net. Gordon Smith.

Further reading

Royal Navy divisions
Military units and formations established in 1909
Military units and formations disestablished in 1912